Deh-e Ali or Deh Ali or Dehali may refer to:
 Deh Ali, Borujen, Chaharmahal and Bakhtiari Province
 Deh Ali, Lordegan, Chaharmahal and Bakhtiari Province
 Dehali, Fars
 Deh-e Ali, Kuhbanan, Kerman Province
 Deh-e Ali, Ravar, Kerman Province
 Deh Ali, Sirjan, Kerman Province
 Deh-e Ali, Yazd